The 22421 /22 Salasar Express is a Superfast Express train belonging to Indian Railways – North Western Railway zone that runs between  and  in India.

It operates as train number 22421 from Delhi Sarai Rohilla to Bhagat Ki Kothi and as train number 22422 in the reverse direction, serving the states of Rajasthan, Haryana and Delhi.

Change of train number

 14705->22421
 14706->22422

Coaches

The 22421 / 22 Salasar Express has 1 First Class AC Coach, 1 AC 2 tier, 3 AC 3 tier, 7 Sleeper Class, 6 General Unreserved & 2 SLR (Seating cum Luggage Rake) coaches. It does not carry a pantry car.

As is customary with most train services in India, coach composition may be amended at the discretion of Indian Railways depending on demand.

Service

As the average speed of the train is above , as per Indian Railways rules, its fare includes a Superfast surcharge.

Routeing

The 22421 / 22 Salasar Express runs from Delhi Sarai Rohilla via , Loharu, Ratangarh, Merta Road to Bhagat Ki Kothi.

Traction

As large sections of the route are yet to be fully electrified, a Bhagat Ki Kothi-based WDP-4 / WDP-4B / WDP-4D locomotive powers the train for its entire journey.

See also 

 Delhi Sarai Rohilla railway station
 Bhagat Ki Kothi railway station
 Rajasthan Sampark Kranti Express
 Mandore Express
 Delhi Sarai Rohilla–Bikaner Superfast Express

References

External links
22421 Salasar Express at India Rail Info
22422 Salasar Express at India Rail Info

Transport in Delhi
Transport in Jodhpur
Express trains in India
Rail transport in Rajasthan
Rail transport in Haryana
Rail transport in Delhi
Named passenger trains of India